Krasnoye may refer to:
 Krasnoye, Krasnensky District, Belgorod Oblast, rural locality and the administrative center of Krasnensky District of Belgorod Oblast, Russia
 Krasnoye, Krasninsky District, Smolensk Oblast, rural locality in the Krasninsky District of Smolensk Oblast, Russia
 Krasnoye, Trubchevsky District, Bryansk Oblast, rural locality in Trubchevsky District, Bryansk Oblast, Russia
 Krasnoye-na-Volge, urban locality in Krasnoselsky District of Kostroma Oblast, Russia
 Krasnoye (crater), a crater on Mars
 Krasnoye Sormovo Factory No. 112, one of the oldest shipbuilding factories in Russia, located in the Sormovsky City District of Nizhny Novgorod

See also 
 Krasny (disambiguation)
 Krasnoye Selo (inhabited locality)
 Lake Krasnoye (disambiguation)